"Girlfriend" is a 1991 song by American power pop musician Matthew Sweet, released as the lead single from his third album, Girlfriend. The song reached No. 4 on the Modern Rock Tracks chart and No. 10 on the Mainstream Rock Tracks chart in Billboard magazine.

In July 2017, Sweet told WXRT radio in Chicago that a friend and musician on the album, Lloyd Cole, convinced him that it was a good song worthy of the album.

Legacy
In 1991, the music video for the song (directed by Roman Coppola) used clips from the anime film Space Adventure Cobra: The Movie.

The song has been used in the Britney Spears film Crossroads (2002) and the music video game Guitar Hero II (2006).

Personnel
Matthew Sweet: vocals, bass guitar, guitar
Robert Quine: lead guitar
Greg Leisz: guitar
Fred Maher – drums

Charts

References

External links
  (official video)

1991 singles
1991 songs
Matthew Sweet songs
Songs written by Matthew Sweet
Song recordings produced by Matthew Sweet
Song recordings produced by Fred Maher
Music videos directed by Roman Coppola
Zoo Entertainment (record label) singles
American power pop songs